The Mazurkas, Op. 7 are a set of five mazurkas by Frédéric Chopin. The mazurkas were written in 1830 – 1832. A typical performance of all five mazurkas takes a little over eleven minutes.

No. 1 in B-flat major
The first mazurka is marked Vivace and is perhaps the most well-known mazurka of the set.

No. 2 in A minor
Despite the Vivo, ma non troppo marking, the mazurka is usually slowly performed, and the main theme is relatively mild.

No. 3 in F minor
The third mazurka is the only one in the set to feature no repeats.

No. 4 in A-flat major
This mazurka was originally composed in 1824; Chopin revised it and put it as the fourth mazurka of the set.

No. 5 in C major
The final mazurka is the shortest of the five, taking less than a minute to perform. It is known as a fine example of the composer's sense of humour.

References

External links 
 Mazurka in B-flat major, Op.7, No.1 (Frédéric François Chopin)

 

Mazurkas by Frédéric Chopin
Music with dedications